Blue zones are regions in the world where people are claimed to live, or have recently lived, longer than average, identified by Gianni Pes, Michel Poulain and Dan Buettner.

Five blue zones have been posited: Okinawa, Japan; Sardinia, Italy; Nicoya, Costa Rica; Icaria, Greece; and Loma Linda, California, United States.

History
The concept of blue zones grew out of demographic work done by Gianni Pes and Michel Poulain, published in 2004 by the journal Experimental Gerontology, who identified Sardinia's Nuoro province as the region with the highest concentration of male centenarians. As the two men zeroed in on the cluster of villages with the highest longevity, they began referring to the area as the "blue zone". Building on this demographic work, Dan Buettner pinpointed four additional locations: Okinawa, Nicoya, Icaria, and Loma Linda.

Zones 
Through continued research, the following five areas have been identified as blue zones:
Sardinia, Italy*
Okinawa, Japan
Nicoya Peninsula, Costa Rica
Icaria, Greece
Loma Linda, California, United States

*In Sardinia, particularly Ogliastra, Barbagia of Ollolai, and Barbagia of Seulo; A village called Seulo, located in the Barbagia of Seulo, holds the record of 20 centenarians from 1996 to 2016, which confirms it is "the place where people live the longest in the world".

In 1998, a study was carried out by the Swiss research group Bluezones in collaboration with System-Biologie AG on the eating habits of the population of Yuzurihara, Japan, where the inhabitants grew very old with the best quality of life. This was part of a worldwide research to find plant species with cell rejuvenation properties. Another research group at the University of California, in collaboration with the University of Rome La Sapienza, is investigating temporal blue zones in Italy outside of Sardinia.

Criticism
A study of claimed longevity in Okinawa was unable to verify whether or not residents were as old as they claimed because many records did not survive World War II. More recent data has shown that life expectancy in Okinawa is no longer exceptional when compared to the rest of Japan: "male longevity is now ranked 26th among the 47 prefectures of Japan."

Harriet Hall, writing for Science-Based Medicine, has written that controlled studies into the blue zones are lacking and the blue zones diet is based on speculation, not solid science.

See also
AARP/Blue Zones Vitality Project
Alameda County Study
Longevity
Centenarian
Supercentenarian
Research into centenarians
Gerontology Research Group

Further reading

References

 
Determinants of health
Life extension
Longevity